The 2018–19 All-Ireland Junior Club Football Championship was the 18th staging of the All-Ireland Junior Club Football Championship since its establishment by the Gaelic Athletic Association.

The All-Ireland final was played on 9 February 2019 at Croke Park in Dublin, between Beaufort and Easkey. Beaufort won the match by 3-17 to 0-05 to claim their first ever championship title.

All-Ireland Junior Club Football Championship

All-Ireland quarter-final

All-Ireland semi-finals

All-Ireland final

References

2018 in Irish sport
2019 in Irish sport
All-Ireland Junior Club Football Championship
All-Ireland Junior Club Football Championship